Laisani Waqa (born 1 January 2002) is a Fijian netball player who plays for Fiji in the positions of goal attack or goal shooter. She was included in the Fijian squad for the 2019 Netball World Cup which was also her maiden appearance at a Netball World Cup. 

She also represented Fiji at the 2018 Commonwealth Games, her maiden appearance at a Commonwealth Games event.

References 

2002 births
Living people
Fijian netball players
Netball players at the 2018 Commonwealth Games
Commonwealth Games competitors for Fiji
People from Nausori
2019 Netball World Cup players
21st-century Fijian women